Geez & Ann is a 2021 Indonesian film directed by Rizki Balki, written by Cassandra Massardi and Adi Nugroho and starring Junior Roberts, Hanggini and Roy Sungkono.

Cast 
 Junior Roberts as Gazza Cahyadi / Geez
 Hanggini as Keana Amanda / Ann
 Roy Sungkono as Bayu
 Shenina Cinnamon as Tari
 Ashira Zamita as April
 Amel Carla as Natha
 Farhan Rasyid as Rifky
 Naimma Aljufri as Thalia
 Andi Viola as Ayla
 Jasmine Elfira as Hana
 Davina Karamoy as Dina
 Ady Sky as Fachri
 Ersa Mayori as Ann's Mother
 Bobby Samuel as Ann's Brother
 Dewi Rezer as Geez's Mother

Release
It was released on February 25, 2021 on Netflix streaming.

References

External links 
 
 

2021 films
Indonesian drama films
2020s Indonesian-language films
Indonesian-language Netflix original films